Thomas Hobbes was Dean of Exeter during 1509.

Notes

Deans of Exeter
16th-century English clergy
Year of birth missing
Year of death missing